The Wichita Fire Department (WFD) provide fire response and basic life support services for Wichita, Kansas.  Organized in 1886, the WFD operates out of 22 Fire Stations organized into four Battalions employing over 400 paid, full-time firefighters.

The WFD operates a fire apparatus fleet of 19 Engines, five Trucks, 12 Squads, one Heavy Rescue, one Mobile Air Unit, one Command Van, one Utility Truck, one USAR Trailer, one Fireground Rehabilitation (Rehab.) Unit, one Hazardous Materials (Haz-Mat.) Unit, one Water Tender, and several other special, support and reserve units.  WFD provides basic life support coverage along with Sedgwick County EMS.

In August 2016, the Wichita Fire Department commemorated their 130th anniversary with recognition of firefighter of the year and reported that they receive 60,000 to 70,000 phone calls a year. In 2010, the Department responded to over 44,000 emergency calls.

Fire Station Locations and Apparatus

Below is a complete listing of all Wichita Fire Department fire station and apparatus locations in the city of Wichita according to Battalion.

1st Battalion

2nd Battalion

3rd Battalion

4th Battalion

Historical
 Station No. 1; 220 N. Market St.; 1906 to ?; demolished in 1976; currently is Heritage Park.  Later move to 3rd and Water; 1930 to ?; demolished in ?; currently is ?.
 Station No. 2; 500 N. Topeka St.; 1930 to 1985; currently houses multiple businesses.
 Station No. 3; ?.
 Station No. 4; 120 S. Seneca St.; 1889 to 1950; currently is ?.
 Station No. 5; ?.
 Station No. 6; 1300 S. Broadway St.; 1909 to 1953; currently houses the Kansas Firefighters Museum.
 Station No. 7; (N. Porter Ave. and Franklin St.); 1922 to 1959; currently is ?.
 Station No. 8; 1100 E. 3rd St N.; 1928 to 1965; currently is a restaurant.
 Station No. 9; 4700 E. Kellogg St.; 1942 to ?; demolished in ?; currently is ?.
 Station No. 10; 1755 N Grove St.; 1949 to 2005; currently is a home.
 Station No. 11; (E. Harry St. & S. George Washington Blvd); 1953 to 1965; currently is ?.
 Station No. 12; 1903 W. Pawnee St.; 1978 to 2003; currently is ?.
 Station No. 13; 1702 S. West St.; 1978 to 2003; currently is ?.

References

Fire departments of Kansas
Organizations based in Wichita, Kansas